Besa (pledge of honor) is an Albanian cultural precept, usually translated as "faith" or "oath", that means "to keep the promise" and "word of honor". The concept is synonymous, and, according to Hofmann, Treimer and Schmidt, etymologically related, to the Classical Latin word fides, which in Late Ancient and Medieval Latin took on the Christian meaning of "faith, (religious) belief" today extant in Romance languages (and then also loaned into Albanian, as feja), but which originally had an ethical/juridical scope. The Albanian adjective besnik, derived from besa, means "faithful", "trustworthy", i.e. one who keeps his word. Besnik for men and Besa for women continue to be very popular names among Albanians. Besa is of prime importance in the Albanian traditional customary law (Kanun) as a cornerstone of personal and social conduct.

Cultural concept and institution 

Besa is a word in the Albanian language meaning pledge of honor. 
The concept is based upon faithfulness toward one's word in the form of loyalty or as an allegiance guarantee. Besa contains mores toward obligations to the family and a friend, the demand to have internal commitment, loyalty and solidarity when conducting oneself with others and secrecy in relation to outsiders. The besa is also the main element within the concept of the ancestor’s will or pledge (amanet) where a demand for faithfulness to a cause is expected in situations that relate to unity, national liberation and independence that transcend a person and generations.

The concept of besa is included in the Kanun, the customary law of the Albanian people. The besa was an important institution within the tribal society of the Albanian Malisors (highlanders). Albanian tribes swore oaths to jointly fight against the government and in this aspect the besa served to uphold tribal autonomy. The besa was used toward regulating tribal affairs between and within the Albanian tribes. The Ottoman government used the besa as a way to co-opt Albanian tribes in supporting state polices or to seal agreements.

During the Ottoman period, the besa would be cited in government reports regarding Albanian unrest, especially in relation to the tribes. The besa formed a central place within Albanian society in relation to generating military and political power. Besas held Albanians together, united them and would wane when the will to enforce them dissipated. In times of revolt against the Ottomans by Albanians, the besa functioned as a link among different groups and tribes.

History
In the Statutes of Scutari, according to Ardian Klosi and Ardian Vehbiu, the verb bessare (trans. to make an oath) is the first documentation of this concept. Afterwards in the missal translated by Gjon Buzuku it is used as per faith "o gruo, e madhe äshte besa jote" (Gospel of Matthew 15:28). In the early 19th century, Markos Botsaris, in his Greek-Albanian dictionary, translated the Albanian "besa" (written "μπέσα") as the Greek "θρησκεία", meaning "religion", or, by extension, "faith".  In 1896, the Ottoman government provincial almanac for Kosovo titled Kosova Salnamesi had a two-page entry on besa and compared it to the French concept of parole d'honneur (word of honor).

Late Ottoman period 

During the Great Eastern Crisis, Albanians gathered in Prizren, Kosovo (1878) and made a besa to form a political alliance (League of Prizren) aimed at upholding Ottoman territorial integrity to prevent the partition of Albanian lands by neighbouring Balkan countries. In 1881 Albanians swore a besa and rebelled against the Ottoman government. Abdul Hamid II opposed blood feuds of the Albanian tribes and issued (1892–1893) a proclamation to the people of the Ișkodra (Shkodër) area urging them to make a besa and reject the practice, in the hope that the very institution (besa) that upheld the vendetta could be used against it.

In 1907, the empire sent a military inspection commission to Kosovo and one of its fact finding objectives was concerned with the prevention of a "general besa" against the Ottoman government. During the Young Turk Revolution of July 1908, Kosovo Albanians that gathered at Firzovik (Ferizaj) agreed to a besa toward pressuring sultan Abdul Hamid II to restore constitutional government. In November 1908 during the Congress of Manastir on the Albanian alphabet question, delegates selected a committee of 11 that swore a besa promising that nothing would be revealed before a final decision and in keeping with that oath agreed to two alphabets as the step forward. During the Albanian revolt of 1910, Kosovo Albanian chieftains gathered at Firzovik and swore a besa to fight the centralist polices of the Ottoman Young Turk government. In the Albanian revolt of 1912, Albanians pledged a besa against the Young Turk government which they had assisted into gaining power in 1908. Haxhi Zeka, a landowner from Ipek (Pejë) organized a meeting of 450 Kosovo Albanian notables in 1899 and they agreed to form Besa-Besë (League of Peja) to fight the Ottoman government and swore a besa to suspend all blood feuding.

World War II 
During World War II under German occupation, Albanians rescued and hid over 2000 Jews from Nazi persecution, motivated in part by the cultural institution of besa that emphasises aiding and protecting people in moments of need.

Modern period 
In Montenegro, an event "Beslidhja e Malësisë" (Pledge of the Highlands) took place in Tuzi (28 June 1970) in the presence of Catholic and Muslim clergy. Families and other extended kin in the Malesia region made a besa and agreed to cease blood feuding and accept state judicial outcomes for victims and perpetrators.

Cultural references

Sayings
Besa-related sayings include: 
 The allegiance of the Albanian is not for sale.
 Albanians would die before they violate honour.
 The honour of the Albanian is worth more than gold

Literature, arts and politics

In 1874 Sami Frashëri wrote a play Besâ yâhut Âhde Vefâ (Pledge of Honor or Loyalty to an Oath) with themes based on an Albanian ethnicity, a bond to an ethnic based territory, ethno-cultural diversity as underlying Ottoman unity, honor, loyalty and self-sacrifice. The play revolved around a betrothed girl kidnapped by a jealous villager that kills her father and whose mother vows revenge co-opting the culprit's father who gives his besa to help not knowing it is his son, later killing him and himself ending with family reconciliation. At the time the play's discussion of besa signified to more astute Ottoman audiences the political implications of the concept and possible subversive connotations in future usage while it assisted Albanians in rallying militarily and politically around a national program. By the early twentieth century, the themes of the play highlighting a besa for self-sacrifice of the homeland carried a subversive message for Albanians to aim at unifying the nation and defend the homeland, something Ottoman authorities viewed as fostering nationalist sentiments.

Frashëri wrote a political treatise Albania: What she has been, What she is, What she shall be (1899) on the Albanian question and proposed that Albanians make a besa to demand the empire and Europe recognize Albanian national rights, especially by applying pressure upon the Ottomans to achieve those aims.

Besa is a key theme in the novel Kush e solli Doruntinën (usually abbreviated in English to "Doruntine") (1980), by Albanian novelist Ismail Kadare.

In the 1980s until 1994, a bimonthly newspaper named Besa was published by the Arvanite community of Greece. 

In the 2010s, the cultural institution of besa featured in an international exhibition named Besa: A Code of Honor by photographer Norman H. Gershman and in an award-winning documentary film Besa: The Promise on the survival of Jews in Albania during the Holocaust.

In 2015, an Albanian political party named Lëvizja Besa (Besa Movement) with an anti-establishment and anti-corruption platform was founded in the Republic of Macedonia.

Usage in Greek 
In Greek, the word has been adopted as "μπέσα", and is used as a more informal synonym for trustworthiness or "philotimo".

See also
Albanian folklore
Kanun
Pashtunwali
Solemn Promise

References

External links
 BESA: The Promise (2012): documentary film on Albanians that rescued Jews in WWII
Besa: A Code of Honor, Muslim Albanians who Rescued Jews During the Holocaust: an online exhibition by Yad Vashem
Besa, Albanian Muslims took vow to save Jews
Photos by Norman Gershman
Documentary seeks to explain why Albanians saved Jews in Holocaust – CNN Belief Blog - CNN.com Blogs
The Legend of Rozafa Castle. How the youngest son gave his "besa".

Albanian culture
Albanian traditions
Rescue of Jews during the Holocaust